Joris Daudet (born 12 February 1991) is a French racing cyclist, and World Champion who represents France in BMX.

Born in Saintes, he won all twelve events on the European BMX tour in 2011.  That year, he also won the World Championship.

He achieved a second place in the time trial event at the 2013 BMX World Championship, and then regained the BMX World Championship in 2016.  In 2017, he finished in third place, before finishing second in 2018.

He was selected to represent France at the 2012 Summer Olympics in the men's BMX event. He also competed at the 2016 Olympics.  He also competed in the 2015 European Games for France in the men's BMX. He earned a gold medal.

References

External links
 
 
 
 

1991 births
Living people
BMX riders
French male cyclists
Olympic cyclists of France
Cyclists at the 2012 Summer Olympics
Cyclists at the 2016 Summer Olympics
Cyclists at the 2020 Summer Olympics
European Games medalists in cycling
European Games gold medalists for France
Cyclists at the 2015 European Games
UCI BMX World Champions (elite men)
People from Saintes, Charente-Maritime
Sportspeople from Charente-Maritime
Cyclists from Nouvelle-Aquitaine